Athenae Diades or Athenai Diades was a town of ancient Euboea, near the promontory Cenaeum, founded by the Athenians, or according to Ephorus, by Dias, a son of Abas. Athenae and Athenai are native names of Athens. In the 5th century BCE, it belonged to the Delian League. At the end of that century it belonged to the territory of the city of Oreus but it recovered its independence at the beginning of 4th century BCE since the town is documented as one of the original members of the Second Athenian League.

Its site is located near the modern village of Yialtra Kastelli/Loutra.

References

Populated places in ancient Euboea
Former populated places in Greece
Athenian colonies
Members of the Delian League